"Let Me Fly" is a vocal trance song written and recorded by Darren Styles and Mark Breeze. It was released as a single in 2003 and reached No. 59 on the UK Singles Chart.

Track listing
CD single
 "Let Me Fly" (Infextious radio edit) – 3:38
 "Let Me Fly" (Muse Zikka's Pink Pocket radio edit) – 3:21
 "Let Me Fly" (Infextious extended mix) – 6:31
 "Let Me Fly" (Styles & Breeze remix) – 5:59

12-inch single
 "Let Me Fly" (original mix) – 6:31
 "Let Me Fly" (club mix) – 7:01

12-inch single
 "Let Me Fly" (club mix) – 7:01
 "Let Me Fly" (Infextious extended mix) – 6:31
 "Let Me Fly" (Styles & Breeze remix) – 5:59

12-inch single
 "Let Me Fly" (The Disco Brothers remix) – 7:44
 "Let Me Fly" (Ilogik remix) – 7:15
 "Let Me Fly" (Futureworld remix) – 5:43

Personnel
Darren Styles & Mark Breeze present Infextious
 Darren Styles – producer, engineer
 Mark Breeze – producer, engineer

Production
 Peter Pritchard – executive producer
 Mark Wilson – executive producer

Additional musicians
 Lisa Abbott – vocals

Chart performance

References

External links
 

2002 songs
2003 singles
Nukleuz singles
Styles & Breeze songs
Songs written by Darren Styles